Events from the year 1338 in Ireland.

Incumbent
Lord: Edward III

Events
 Justiciar de Charleton campaigns against the Leinster Irish
 Edmond de Burgh, son of the 3rd Earl of Ulster, is drowned in Lough Mask by his cousins Edmond Albanach de Burgh and his brother Raymond "who fastened a stone to his neck ... The destruction of the English of Connacht, and of his own in particular, resulted from this deed." King Toirdhealbhach of Connacht expels Edmund to western isles of Connacht "after the territories and churches of Iar Connacht (the west of Connacht) had been greatly destroyed between them;" Toirdhelbhach "then assumed the sway of the whole province." Edmund collects a "large fleet of ships and barks ... and he remained for a long time on the islands of the sea."
 Irish attack and expel the Anglo-Irish of Luighne and Corann (County Sligo) and retake their hereditary lands
 Matilda, countess of Ulster, offers to surrender lands in Ulster for others in England
 "Teige, son of Rory, son of Cathal O'Conor (who was usually called Bratach Righin), was taken prisoner by Thomas Magauran, and many of his people were killed. Magauran (i.e. Thomas) afterwards went to the house of O'Conor; but, on his return, the Clann-Murtough, and the Muintir-Eolais, assembled to meet him, and took him prisoner, after having slain many of his people."
 Robert de Henningsberg appointed Lord Chancellor of Ireland

Births

Deaths

 "Hugh an Chletigh, son of Rory O'Conor, was wounded in the rear of his own army, and died in consequence."
 "Dearbhail, daughter of Cathal Mac Murrough, and wife of Donough, son of Hugh Oge, died."

References

"The Annals of Ireland by Friar John Clyn", edited and translated with an Introduction, by Bernadette Williams, Four Courts Press, 2007. , pp. 240–244.
"A New History of Ireland VIII: A Chronology of Irish History to 1976", edited by T. W. Moody, F.X. Martin and F.J. Byrne. Oxford, 1982. .
http://www.ucc.ie/celt/published/T100001B/index.html
http://www.ucc.ie/celt/published/T100005C/index.html
http://www.ucc.ie/celt/published/T100010B/index.html

 
1330s in Ireland
Ireland
Years of the 14th century in Ireland